Astrothelium colombiense is a species of corticolous (bark-dwelling), crustose lichen in the family Trypetheliaceae. Found in Colombia, it was formally described as a new species in 2016 by Dutch lichenologist André Aptroot. The lichen has shiny, pale ochraceous green  thallus with a smooth to somewhat roughened texture. It has a cortex but lacks a prothallus. There is only a single ascospore in each ascus; this is a rarity in genus Astrothelium. The spores are hyaline, ellipsoid in shape, and muriform (i.e., divided into chambers by multiple transverse and longitudinal septa); they measure 240–300 by 45–50 µm. No lichen products were detected in this species. The specific epithet refers to the country of the type locality.

References

colombiense
Lichen species
Lichens described in 2016
Lichens of Colombia
Taxa named by André Aptroot